MTV2, a music video channel in the United States and the sister channel to MTV, has produced many television series and special events since its 1996 founding. This is a list of MTV2 shows that have made the channel notable over the years. Television shows are listed by the first letter in the title of the film or broadcast (not including the words "a", "an", or "the").

All series and special events listed on this page either originally aired on MTV2 or regularly aired in repeats on the channel. MTV2 has also aired other MTV shows in an irregular pattern. For these shows, see List of programs broadcast by MTV.

Current programming

Series repeats from other Paramount Media Networks

Comedy Central
Key & Peele (2020-present)
Reno 911! (2020-present)
South Park (2021-present)
Tosh.0 (2020-present)
Workaholics (2021-present)

CBS
48 Hours (2021-present)

MTV
16 and Pregnant (2014-present)
Jersey Shore (2009-present)
Jersey Shore: Family Vacation (2020-present)

VH1
Martha & Snoop's Potluck Dinner Party (2018-present)

Other acquired series repeats
Cheaters (2019-present)
The Fresh Prince of Bel Air (2017-present) 
The Jamie Foxx Show (2016-present)
Living Single (2018-present)
Sister, Sister (2021-present)
Scare Tactics (2021-present)

Award show simulcasts
BET Awards (2016-present)
MTV Movie & TV Awards (2016-present)
MTV Video Music Awards (2016-present)
NAACP Image Awards (2021-present)

Former programming

Original programming

Music

120 Minutes (2001–2003, 2011–2013)
Amp (2000–2002)
Back in Play (2002–2003)
Chart2Chart (2002–2003)
Control Freak (2001–2005)
The Definitive (2002–2004)
Discover & Download (2005–2010)
Dudesons (2010-2011)
Elite 8 (2006–2009)
Greatest Hits (2004–2005)
Headbangers Ball (2003–2012)
Hip-Hop Countdown (2002–2005)
Hip-Hop Show (2003–2005)
Hip Hop's Toughest Rhymes (2004–2008)
Hits Countdown (2003–2005)
The Hottest MCs in the Game (2007–2012)
Latest and Greatest (2001–2004, 2007)
Makes A Video (2003–present)
MTV2 $2 Bill Concert Series (2002–2006)
MTV2 Dance (2002)
MTV2 Hip-Hop (2001–2003)
MTV2 Jams (2010–2017, AMTV2) 
MTV2 Request (2001)
MTV2 Rock (2001–2004, 2005)
MTV2 Soul (2001–2003)
numbNuts (2012)
Playback (1998–2001)
Retro Videos (2002)
Riffs & Rhymes (2002)
Rock Countdown (2002–2005 as Top 20; 2005–2006 as Top 10)
Rock n' Jock (2010)
Saturday Rock the Deuce (2007–2010)
Spankin' New (2002–2003)
Subterranean (2003-2011)
Sucker Free (2005–2012)
Sucker Free Countdown (2005–2012)
Sucker Free Sunday (2003–2005)
Video Mods (2004–2005)
Videography/Timeslide (1997–2001)
The Week in Jams (2012–2013)
Yo! MTV Raps Classic Cuts (2012)
You Rock the Deuce (2007–2017; 2005–2011 as T-Minus Rock)

Live-action 

90's House (2017)
Ain't That America (2013–2014)
The Andy Milonakis Show (2005–2007)
Anton & Crapbag (2008)
The Atom Show (2010)
Binge Thinking (2016)
Burnout: The Ultimate Drag Race Challenge (2011)
Charlamagne and Friends (2013)
Converse Band of Ballers (2011)
Crank Yankers (2007 season)
Dogshitter Wants
The Dub Magazine Project (2011)
Final Fu (2006)
Funk Flex Full Throttle
Fur TV (2010)
Guy Code (2011-2015)
Guy Court (2013)
Hip Hop Squares (2012)
Invincible (2008)
Jobs That Don't Suck (2014)
Joking Off (2015-2016)
Mac Miller and the Most Dope Family (2013-2014)
Magical Realm (2008)
MTV2 Legit (2009)
Not Exactly News (2015)
Nitro Circus Live (2012–2014)
Off the Bat (2014)
The Ride (2010)
School of Surf (2009)
Shinesty (2017)
Sportsblender (2006)
Stankervision (2005–2006)
Team Sanchez (2005–2006)
Ultimate Parkour Challenge
The VBS Show (2009)
Nick Cannon Presents: Wild 'n Out (2005-2007; 2013–2016)
Wildboyz (2005–2006)

Animated

The Adventures of Chico and Guapo (2006)
Celebrity Deathmatch (2006–2007)
Friday: The Animated Series (2007)
Where My Dogs At? (2006)
Wonder Showzen (2005–2006)

Repeats from sister networks or other sources

3 South
16 & Recovering
Æon Flux
American Ninja Warrior
America's Funniest Home Videos
Are You the One?
AST Dew Tour
Awkwafina Is Nora from Queens (2020-21)
Beavis and Butt-Head (2004-2006, 2012)
The Bernie Mac Show
BoJack Horseman (2021)
Boy Meets World
Broad City (2021)
Broke A$$ Game Show
Bully Beatdown
The Busch Family Brewed
Celebrity Deathmatch
The Challenge
Chappelle's Show (2021)
Crank Yankers (2020-21)
Clone High
Cops Reloaded
The Daily Show with Trevor Noah
Damage Control
Daria
Deliciousness (2021)
Disaster Date
Double Shot at Love
DJ & the Fro
Drake & Josh
Drunk History (2020-22)
The Dudesons in America
Entourage
Everybody Hates Chris
Ex on the Beach
Families of the Mafia
Family Matters
Ghosted: Love Gone Missing
Girlfriends
Greatest Party Story Ever
The Hard Times of RJ Berger
The Head
Heat Guy J (anime series licensed from Geneon)
How Far Is Tattoo Far? (2020-21)
In Living Color
Invader Zim (2006)
It's Always Sunny in Philadelphia (2016)
Jackass
Jersey Shore 
Just Jordan
Kappa Mikey (2006)
Kenan & Kel (2016)
Legends of Chamberlain Heights (2016)
Love and Listings
Love Island
Life of Ryan
Lucha Libre USA
Made
Malcolm & Eddie 
Malcolm in the Middle
Martin
Marvel Anime
The Maxx
My Wife and Kids
New Girl
Next
Nitro Circus
North Palm Wrestling
Pimp my Ride
The Parkers
The PJs
Popzilla (2009)
Pranked
The Real World
Real World/Road Rules Challenge
The Ren & Stimpy Show
Revenge Prank
Ridiculousness
Rob & Big
Rob Dyrdek's Fantasy Factory
Romeo!
Run's House
Sabrina, the Teenage Witch
Scarred
Scrubs
Siesta Key
Silent Library
Smart Guy
South Park (2017-2019; 2021-2022)
SpongeBob SquarePants (2006-2007, 2021)
Teen Mom 2 (2019-21)
Teen Mom OG (2021)
Trick My Truck
True Life (2017-19, 2021)
Tiny Toon Adventures
Undergrads
Unplugged (2021)
Viva La Bam
Warren the Ape
The Wayans Bros.
Wildboyz
Yo Momma
Zoey 101

Special Events 
24 Hours of Foo (2005)
24 Hours of Love (2002)
A-Z video marathon (2000)
Balls Out Comedy Friday (2010–present)
Bellator Fighting Championships (2011–2013)
Box Set Weekend (2002)
Dew Circuit Breakout (2006)
Increase The Beat (2002)
Jackassworld.com: 24 Hour Takeover (2008)
Lingerie Football League (2011-2012)
Madonna Weekend (2003)
Most Controversial Videos (2002)
MTV Europe Music Awards (2010–present)
MTV Video Music Awards (2004–present)
Premios MTV Latinoamérica (2002–2005)
MTV2OONS (2004)
Sic 'Em Friday (2005–2006)
Sic 'Emation (2006) 
Sucker Free Summit (2010–present)
Unplugged 2.0 (2001–2002)
VMA Winners (2002–2005)

Mtv2